Harrison Wood (born 14 June 2000) is a British professional racing cyclist, who currently rides for UCI WorldTeam .

Major results
2019
 9th Chrono des Nations U23
2021
 8th International Rhodes Grand Prix
2022
 1st Stage 2 
 2nd Overall Vuelta a Navarra

References

External links

2000 births
Living people
English male cyclists
Sportspeople from Torquay